Executive Suite is a 1954 American Metro-Goldwyn-Mayer drama film directed by Robert Wise and written by Ernest Lehman, based on the 1952 novel of the same name by Cameron Hawley. The film stars William Holden, June Allyson, Barbara Stanwyck, Fredric March, Walter Pidgeon, Shelley Winters, Paul Douglas, Louis Calhern, Dean Jagger, and Nina Foch. The plot depicts the internal struggle for control of a furniture manufacturing company after the unexpected death of the company's CEO. Executive Suite was nominated for multiple Academy Awards, including for Nina Foch's performance, which earned a Best Supporting Actress nomination.

This was Lehman's first produced screenplay, and its plot deviates substantially from the novel. He went on to write Sabrina, North by Northwest, West Side Story, and other films. The film is one of few in Hollywood history without a musical score.

Plot

While in New York City to meet with investment bankers, 56-year-old Avery Bullard, president and driving force of the Tredway Corporation, a major furniture manufacturing company in the town of Millburgh, Pennsylvania, drops dead in the street. As he collapses, he drops his wallet. A bystander picks it up, steals the cash, and shoves the wallet into a wastebasket. As a result, there is no way to immediately identify the body.

George Caswell, a member of the Tredway board of directors and one of the investment bankers with whom Bullard had just met, sees what he believes is Bullard's body in the street below their offices. He tells his broker to make a short sale of as much Tredway stock as he can before the end of trading that Friday afternoon. Caswell plans to make an easy profit and cover the sale by buying Tredway stock at "a 10-point discount" on Monday, when news of Bullard's death will push the stock price down. Caswell begins to doubt that it was Bullard who died, but when he reads in a newspaper that the man had the initials "A.B." on his clothes and cufflinks, he calls the police to tip them off to the identity of the deceased.

Bullard had never named his successor nor had he appointed an executive vice-president since the previous one died. Over the next 28 hours, Tredway's executives vie for the position of president. 

Company controller Loren Shaw arranges Bullard's funeral and coordinates the company's public reaction. In so doing, he undercuts treasurer Frederick Alderson, one of Bullard's close friends, and this effectively diminishes Alderson in his own eyes so that he does not seek the presidency. Shaw also releases the upcoming quarterly report so that the news of big profits can counter the effect of Bullard's death and perhaps even raise the stock price when the market opens. Ambitious, but narrowly focused, Shaw is concerned more with short-term accounting gains and satisfying the stockholders than the quality of the company's actual products and long-term growth. 

He gains the proxy of Julia Tredway, the daughter of the company's founder, who is a major shareholder and board member. She had been considering selling her stock after realizing the futility of her difficult romantic relationship with and love for Bullard after many years. She was finally heartbroken after coming second behind the company for both her father and Bullard.

Shaw buys Caswell's vote in exchange for allowing Caswell to purchase 4,000 shares of company stock at the Friday closing price to cover his unscrupulous short sale. If Caswell does not get those shares, he will be in serious financial trouble. Meanwhile, Walt Dudley, the back-slapping Vice President of Sales, is having an affair with his secretary, Eva Bardeman, which Shaw uses to blackmail him.

Vice President of Manufacturing Jesse Grimm decides to retire instead of seeking the top job. But while he is no fan of Shaw's, he has serious reservations about the relative youth of the only other potential contender, Don Walling, the idealistic Vice President for Design and Development.

All these machinations result in Shaw having enough votes to get the job even before the board meets. Treasurer Alderson and Walling, however, are determined to thwart Shaw. Walling convinces Alderson to back him. Walling is a strong believer in developing new, higher quality products and more efficient manufacturing methods, although his wife, Mary, is against his giving up his dream of being a full-time designer.
 
At an emergency board meeting on Saturday evening, the machinations, bargaining, and maneuvering culminate in Walling's enthusiasm, vision, and his stirring boardroom speech eventually swaying Grimm, Dudley and Julia Tredway to his side. He is elected unanimously after Shaw accepts his defeat. Shaw then tears up a letter endorsing Caswell's share purchase, much to Caswell's dismay. Walling and his wife embrace.

Cast

 William Holden as McDonald "Don" Walling, V.P. for Design and Development
 June Allyson as Mary Blemond Walling, wife of Don Walling
 Barbara Stanwyck as Julia O. Tredway, daughter and heir of Tredway's founder, and Bullard's mistress
 Fredric March as Loren Phineas Shaw, V.P. and Controller
 Walter Pidgeon as Frederick Y. Alderson, V.P. and Treasurer
 Shelley Winters as Eva Bardeman, secretary and mistress to Walter Dudley
 Paul Douglas as Josiah Walter Dudley, V.P. for Sales
 Louis Calhern as George Nyle Caswell, board member
 Dean Jagger as Jesse Q. Grimm, V.P. for Manufacturing
 Nina Foch as Erica Martin, secretary to Bullard and the Board of Directors
 Tim Considine as Mike Walling, son of Don Walling

 William Phipps as Bill Lundeen
 Lucille Knoch as Mrs. George Nyle Caswell
 Edgar Stehl as Julius Steigel
 Mary Adams as Sara Asenath Grimm, wife of Jessie Grimm
 Virginia Brissac as Edith Alderson, wife of Fred Alderson
 Harry Shannon as Ed Benedeck
 Raoul Freeman as Avery Bullard
 Chet Huntley as narrator (introduction)

Cast notes:
 Actress Mimi Doyle, who played the telephone operator, was director Robert Wise's sister-in-law.  Her twin sister Patricia also had a role in the film.

Production
Dore Schary, MGM's head of production, originally intended to produce the film himself, but turned it over to John Houseman because he was too busy.  Schary intended for the film to have no musical score, using sounds such as "church bells, sirens, the roar of traffic, crowd noises, horns, the squeal of tires, faraway screams of brakes."

Executive Suite was the first film written by Ernest Lehman, who was a journalist, although he had shared an original story credit for Republic Pictures' 1948 film The Inside Story.  The film was also the first film that director Robert Wise made for MGM.

The all-star cast created problems in scheduling, since only a handful of the lead actors had any commitment to MGM.  The logistics of scheduling were so complex that the studio had to set an "inflexible" starting date two months in advance of shooting, the first time that MGM had ever done so.

The film was planned to have 145 speaking parts, a record for MGM, however only 66 actors were listed in the credits.

Reception
Contemporaneous

The film received enthusiastic reviews. In its January 1995 issue Fortune magazine published a four-page article, "The Executive as Hero", which praised the film, commenting that it "has set in motion the conflicts and collisions that give business its true drama." However, Bosley Crowther, writing in The New York Times called it "[A] pretty chilly succession of echoing rooms", and commented that "for all of Mr. Holden's fine oration the ideal of stouter furniture and a happier furniture corporation doesn't cause the blood to run hot." Crowther does praise the "quality production and general quality acting of the film", and calls it "a fair endeavor" but notes that "dramatically, it doesn't add up."

Box office

The was number one at the U.S. box office for four consecutive weeks during May 1954, grossing $1,845,000. According to MGM records, the film eventually earned theatrical rentals of $2,682,000 in the U.S. and Canada, and $903,000 in other markets, for a worldwide total of $3,585,000 and a profit of $772,000.

Modern

The film has received critical acclaim from modern day critics. Rotten Tomatoes gives a score of 100% based on 9 reviews, with an average score of 8/10.

Awards and nominations

TV series

More than two decades later, the film and novel were adapted into a weekly television series with the same title. Airing on CBS in 1976-1977, the TV version changed the fictional corporate setting to the Cardway Corporation in Los Angeles. Mitchell Ryan starred as company chairman Dan Walling, with Sharon Acker as his wife Helen and Leigh McCloskey and Wendy Phillips as his children, Brian and Stacey. Other series regulars included Stephen Elliott, Byron Morrow, Madlyn Rhue, William Smithers, Paul Lambert, Richard Cox, Trisha Noble, Carl Weintraub, Maxine Stuart, and Ricardo Montalbán.

Scheduling opposite Monday Night Football on ABC, and then The Rockford Files on NBC, doomed the show to poor ratings, and it was canceled after one season.

References

External links
 
 
 
 
 

1954 films
1954 romantic drama films
American business films
American romantic drama films
American black-and-white films
1940s English-language films
Films about businesspeople
Films adapted into television shows
Films based on American novels
Films based on romance novels
Films directed by Robert Wise
Films set in New York City
Films shot from the first-person perspective
Films shot in Allentown, Pennsylvania
Metro-Goldwyn-Mayer films
Venice Grand Jury Prize winners
American novels adapted into films
Films with screenplays by Ernest Lehman
1950s English-language films
1950s American films